Wellingtonbridge, also spelled Wellington Bridge, is a village in south County Wexford, Ireland. It lies some 24 km west of Wexford and 28 km east of Waterford, at the intersection of the R733 and R736 regional roads. It was historically called Ballyowen after the townland it occupies.

Facilities
The village has a wide array of facilities and amenities including a department store, pharmacy, supermarket, garden centre, café, beauty salon,  pub/restaurant, opticians, vet, hair salon, furniture shop, barbers, filling station, car dealer, and playground.

Transport

Rail
The village was on the Limerick-Rosslare railway line: Wellingtonbridge railway station, which was formerly an important point for the loading of sugar beet, opened on 1 August 1906 and closed on 18 September 2010.

Bus
The rail service was replaced by a revised Bus Éireann route 370 service from Monday 20 September 2010.  It is also served by Local Link route 388 as well as once-weekly Bus Éireann routes 372 and 373.

Ardcavan, a County Wexford-based bus company provided a daily service from Wellingtonbridge to Dublin and Dublin Airport for many years though this route was discontinued in 2018.

Notable people
 Mick Wallace, businessman and politician

See also
 List of populated places in Ireland

References

External links

Towns and villages in County Wexford